Testacella is genus of small to medium-large, predatory, air-breathing, land slugs. 

They are terrestrial gastropod mollusks in the family Testacellidae, the shelled slugs. They are not often seen because they live underground.

Testacella is the only genus in the family, in other words it is a monotypic family. Testacella is the type genus of the family Testacellidae.

Distribution
Species within this genus of slugs live in north Africa, southern and western Europe, and Britain.

Species 
Species within the genus Testacella include:
 Subgenus Testacella Draparnaud, 1801
 Subgenus Testacelloides A. J. Wagner, 1914

 † Testacella asinium Serres, 1827 
 Testacella bisulcata Risso, 1826
 Testacella bracciai Nardi & Bodon, 2011
 † Testacella bruntoniana Serres, 1851 
 † Testacella deshayesii Michaud, 1855 
 Testacella fischeriana Bourguignat, 1862
 Testacella gestroi Issel, 1873
 Testacella haliotidea Lamarck, 1801 - the shelled slug, the type species of the genus
 † Testacella lartetii Dupuy, 1850 
 Testacella maugei Férussac, 1819
 † Testacella pedemontana Sacco, 1886 
 † Testacella pontileviensis de Morgan, 1920 
 † Testacella puisseguri Schlickum, 1967 
 Testacella riedeli Giusti, Manganelli & Schembri, 1995
 † Testacella sandbergeri Wenz, 1914 
 † Testacella schuetti Schlickum, 1967 
 Testacella scutulum Sowerby I, 1821
 † Testacella zellii Klein, 1853
Nomen dubium
 Testacella antillarum Grateloup, 1855
Synonyms
 Testacella anomala Torres Minquez, 1924: synonym of Testacella haliotidea Draparnaud, 1801
 Testacella barcinonensis Pollonera, 1888: synonym of Testacella haliotidea Draparnaud, 1801
 Testacella catalonica Pollonera, 1888: synonym of Testacella scutulum G. B. Sowerby I, 1821 (original name)
 Testacella dikrangensis Godwin-Austen, 1876: synonym of Girasia dikrangensis (Godwin-Austen, 1876) (original combination)
 Testacella dubia Pollonera, 1888: synonym of Testacella haliotidea Draparnaud, 1801
 Testacella esserana Fagot, 1892: synonym of Testacella haliotidea Draparnaud, 1801
 Testacella europaea de Roissy, 1805: synonym of Testacella haliotidea Draparnaud, 1801
 Testacella galliae Oken, 1816: synonym of Testacella haliotidea Draparnaud, 1801
 Testacella guadeloupensis Lesson, 1838: synonym of Omalonyx unguis (d'Orbigny, 1836) (junior synonym)
 † Testacella larteti Dupuy, 1850 : synonym of † Testacella lartetii Dupuy, 1850 (incorrect subsequent spelling)
 Testacella matheronii Potiez & Michaud, 1838: synonym of Omalonyx unguis (d'Orbigny, 1836) (junior synonym)
 Testacella subtrigona Pollonera, 1888: synonym of Testacella haliotidea Draparnaud, 1801(original name)
 Testacella vagans F. W. Hutton, 1882: synonym of Testacella maugei Férussac, 1819

Description
These slugs have a very small, ear-shaped shell, which is situated far back on their bodies.

In the family Testacellidae, the number of haploid chromosomes lies between 31 and 35 (according to the values in this table).

Habitat
These slugs are rarely observed, but they tend to live in gardens and farms where there is rich soil and a lot of earthworms.

Life habits
These slugs live underground and hunt earthworms. They are usually only seen when they are forced up to the surface because the soil has become completely saturated with rain.

References

External links 
 Lamarck, J. B. (1801). Système des animaux sans vertèbres, ou tableau général des classes, des ordres et des genres de ces animaux; Présentant leurs caractères essentiels et leur distribution, d'apres la considération de leurs rapports naturels et de leur organisation, et suivant l'arrangement établi dans les galeries du Muséum d'Histoire Naturelle, parmi leurs dépouilles conservées; Précédé du discours d'ouverture du Cours de Zoologie, donné dans le Muséum National d'Histoire Naturelle l'an 8 de la République. Published by the author and Deterville, Paris: viii + 432 pp

 "Testacella Species"
 "Have You Seen A Shelled Slug Called Testacella!"
 "A predatory (shell) slug (Testacella haliotidea)"